This list of Michigan rivers includes all streams designated rivers although some may be smaller than those streams designated creeks, runs, brooks, swales, cuts, bayous, outlets, inlets, drains and ditches. These terms are all in use in Michigan. Other waterways are listed when they have articles.

The state has over 300 named rivers. Several names are shared by different rivers; for example, there are eight Pine Rivers and seven Black Rivers. In four cases there are two rivers of the same name in one county. In these cases extra information such as alternate name or body of water they flow into has been added.

In alphabetical order

A–C 

Anna River
Au Gres River
Au Sable River
Au Train River
Bad River
Baldwin River
Baltimore River
Bark River
Bass River
Battle Creek River
Bean Creek (called Tiffin River in lower reaches)
Bear River
Bell River
Belle River
Betsie River
Big Betsy River
Big Garlic River
Big Iron River
Big River
Big Sable River
Big Siskiwit River
Birch Creek
Black Mallard River
Black River (Alcona County)
Black River (Allegan/Van Buren counties)
Black River (Cheboygan/Montmorency/Presque Isle/Otsego counties)
Black River (Gogebic County)
Black River (Mackinac County)
Black River (Marquette County)
Black River (Sanilac/St. Clair counties)
Blind Sucker River
Boardman River
Boyne River
Brevoort River
Brule River
Buck Creek
Canada Creek
Carp Lake River
Carp River (Chippewa/Mackinac County)
Carp River (Gogebic/Ontonagon counties), sections also called Big Carp River and Upper Carp River or Carp River Inlet or Inlet Creek
Carp River (Luce County), not on USGS maps
Carp River (Marquette County)
Cass River
Cataract River
Cedar Creek
Cedar River (Antrim County)
Cedar River (Clare/Gladwin counties)
Cedar River (Menominee County)
Charlotte River
Cheboygan River
Chippewa River
Choate Creek
Chocolay River
Clam River
Cliff River
Clinton River
Coldbrook Creek
Coldwater River (Barry/Kent/Ionia counties)
Coldwater River (Branch County)
Coldwater River (Isabella counties)
Cranberry River
Creighton River
Crooked River
Crow River
Crystal River
Cut River (Mackinac County)
Cut River (Roscommon County)

D–K 

Days River
Dead River
Dead Sucker River
Deer River
Detroit River
Devils River
Dingman River
Dowagiac River
Driggs River
Duck River, also called Duck Creek
Eagle River
East Branch St. Joseph River
East Sleeping River
Ecorse River
Elk River
Elm River
Escanaba River
Falls River
Fawn River
Fence River
Firesteel River
Fishdam River
Flat River
Flint River
Flintsteel River
Floodwood River
Ford River
Fox River
Galena River
Galien River
Gogomain River
Gook Creek
Goose Creek
Grand River
Grass River
Gratiot River
Graveraet River
Green River, flows into Jordan River
Green River, part of Intermediate River system
Gun River
Hemlock River
Hendrie River
Hersey River
Huron River (Baraga/Marquette counties)
Huron River (Monroe/Wayne/Washtenaw/Livingston/Oakland counties)
Hurricane River
Indian River (Alger/Schoolcraft counties)
Indian River (Cheboygan County)
Intermediate River
Iron River (Iron County)
Iron River (Marquette County)
Joe Maddy River
Jordan River
Jordan River of Beaver Island
Jumbo River
Kalamazoo River
Kawkawlin River
Kelso River

L–M 

Laughing Whitefish River
Leland River, also called the Carp River
Lincoln River
Little Betsie River (Lower Peninsula of Michigan)
Little Betsy River (Upper Peninsula of Michigan)
Little Black River (Cheboygan County)
Little Black River (Gogebic County)
Little Brevoort River
Little Carp River (Baraga County)
Little Carp River (Cheboygan County), also called Carp River and Carp Creek
Little Carp River (Gogebic/Ontonagon counties)
Little Cedar River (Gladwin County)
Little Cedar River (Menominee County)
Little Cranberry River
Little Dead River
Little Elm River
Little Fawn River
Little Fishdam River
Little Fox River
Little Garlic River
Little Gratiot River
Little Hemlock River
Little Huron River
Little Indian River
Little Iron River
Little Manistee River
Little Maple River
Little Misery River
Little Molasses River
Little Munuscong River
Little Muskegon River
Little Ocqueoc River
Little Otter River
Little Pigeon River (Cheboygan/Otsego Counties), empties into Pigeon River
Little Pigeon River (Huron County)
Little Presque Isle River
Little Rabbit River
Little Rainy River
Little Rapid River
Little River (Big Bay de Noc)
Little River (Menominee River tributary)
Little River Raisin
Little Silver River
Little Siskiwit River
Little Sturgeon River
Little Thornapple River, tributary of the Coldwater River in Barry County
Little Thornapple River, tributary of the Thornapple River in Eaton County
Little Tobacco River
Little Trout River
Little Two Hearted River
Little Union River
Looking Glass River
Lower Millecoquins River
Macatawa River
Malletts Creek
Manistee River
Manistique River
Maple Leaf Creek
Maple River (Cheboygan/Emmett counties)
Maple River (Ionia/Clinton/Gratiot/Shiawassee counties)
Maple River (Newaygo/Muskegon counties)
McCoy Creek
Medora River
Menominee River
Michigamme River
Middle Branch River
Milakokia River
Milk River
Mineral River
Miners River
Misery River
Misteguay Creek
Mitchigan River
Molasses River
Montreal River (Keweenaw County)
Montreal River (Wisconsin–Michigan border)
Moran River
Mosquito River
Munuscong River
Murphy River
Muskegon River

N–R 

Net River
New River
North River
Nottawa Creek (also known as Nottawa River)
Ocqueoc River
Ogontz River
Ontonagon River
Ore Creek (Livingston County)
Ottawa River, usually called North Tenmile Creek
Otter River
Paint Creek (Oakland County)
Paint Creek (Washtenaw/Monroe counties)
Paint River
Partridge Creek
Paw Paw River
Pelton River, also called Pelton Creek
Pentwater River
Perch River
Pere Marquette River
Peshekee River
Pigeon River (Cheboygan/Otsego counties), empties into Mullett Lake
Pigeon River (Huron County), empties into Saginaw Bay of Lake Huron
Pigeon River (Ottawa County), empties into Lake Michigan
Pigeon River (St. Joseph County), empties into the St. Joseph River
Pike River
Pilgrim River
Pinconning River
Pine Creek (Gratiot County)
Pine River (Alcona/Iosco counties)
Pine River (Arenac County)
Pine River (Charlevoix County)
Pine River (Chippewa/Mackinac counties)
Pine River (Lake/Manistee/Osceola/Wexford counties), also called South Branch of Manistee River
Pine River (Marquette County)
Pine River (Mecosta/Isabella/Montcalm/Gratiot/Midland counties)
Pine River (St. Clair County)
Pinnebog River
Plaster Creek
Platte River
Pointe aux Chenes River
Portage River (Houghton County), the southern end of the Keweenaw Waterway
Portage River (Jackson/Washtenaw counties), a tributary of the Grand River
Portage River (Kalamazoo/St. Joseph counties), a tributary of the St. Joseph River
Portage River (Livingston/Washtenaw counties), a tributary of the Huron River
Potagannissing River
Potato River
Prairie River
Presque Isle River
Quanicassee River
Rabbit River
Rainy River
Rapid River (Delta/Marquette counties)
Rapid River (Kalkaska County)
Rapid River (Ontonagon County)
Ravine River
Red Cedar River
Rifle River
River Raisin
River Rouge or Rouge River
River Styx (Gratiot County)
River Styx (Marquette County)
Rock River (Alger County)
Rock River (Baraga County)
Rock River (Mackinaw County)
Rocky River
Rogue River
Ruby Creek

S–Z 

Saganing River
Sage River
Saginaw River
Saint Clair River
St. Joseph River (Lake Michigan)
St. Marys River
Saline River
Salmon Trout River (Houghton County)
Salmon Trout River (Marquette County) 
Salt River (Macomb County)
Salt River (Midland/Isabella counties)
Sand River 
Sandy Creek
Sante River
Sauk River
Sebewaing River
Second River
Shakey River
Shelldrake River
Shiawassee River
Shoepac River
Silver River (Baraga County), drains to Lake Superior
Silver River (Baraga–Houghton counties), drains to Sturgeon River
Silver River (Keweenaw County), drains to Lake Superior
Siskiwit River
Slate River (Baraga County)
Slate River (Gogebic County)
Snake River
South Branch Little Sugar River
Spruce River
Spurr River
Stout Creek
Sturgeon River (Alger/Delta counties)
Sturgeon River (Baraga/Houghton counties)
Sturgeon River (Cheboygan/Otsego counties)
Sturgeon River (Dickinson County)
Sucker River
Sugar River
Swan River
Swartz Creek
Sycamore Creek
Tacoosh River
Tahquamenon River
Talmadge Creek
Tamarack River
Tawas River
Thornapple River
Thunder Bay River
Tioga River
Tittabawassee River
Tobacco River (Keweenaw County, Michigan)
Tobacco River (Tittabawassee River)
Torch River
Trap Rock River
Traverse River
Trout Creek
Trout River
Two Hearted River
Union River
Upper Millecoquins River
Vermilac River
Waiska River
Walker Creek
Walton River
West Branch St. Joseph River
West Sleeping River
White River (Huron County)
White River (Muskegon/Oceana counties)
Whitefish River
Yellow Dog River

By watershed

Lake Erie basin 

 Maumee River (OH)
 Tiffin River (OH)
 Bean Creek
 St. Joseph River (OH)
 East Branch Saint Joseph River
 West Branch Saint Joseph River
 Ottawa River
 Little Lake Creek
 Flat Creek
 North River
 River Raisin
 Saline River
 Little River Raisin
 Goose Creek
 Sandy Creek
 Huron River (Monroe/Wayne/Washtenaw/Livingston/Oakland counties)
 Portage River (Livingston/Washtenaw counties)
 Detroit River
 Ecorse River
 River Rouge or Rouge River

Lake St. Clair basin 

 Milk River
 Clinton River
 Paint Creek
 Trout Creek
 Salt River (Macomb County)
 Saint Clair River
 Belle River
 Pine River (St. Clair County)
 Black River (Sanilac/St. Clair counties)

Lake Huron basin

The Thumb 
 White River (Huron County, Michigan)
 New River
 Pinnebog River
 Pigeon River (Huron County)
 Little Pigeon River (Huron County)

Saginaw Bay 

 Sebewaing River
 Quanicassee River
 Saginaw River
 Shiawassee River
 Cass River
 Flint River
 Misteguay Creek
 Swartz Creek
 Bad River
 Tittabawassee River
 Chippewa River
 Pine River (Mecosta/Isabella/Montcalm/Gratiot/Midland counties)
 Coldwater River (Isabella County)
 Walker Creek
 Salt River (Midland/Isabella counties)
 Tobacco River
 Little Cedar River (Gladwin County)
 Cedar River (Clare/Gladwin counties)
 Molasses River
 Little Molasses River
 Little Tobacco River
 Sugar River
 South Branch Little Sugar River
 Kawkawlin River
 Pinconning River
 Saganing River
 Pine River
 Rifle River
 Au Gres River
 Tawas River

Northeast Lower Peninsula of Michigan 
 Au Sable River
 Pine River (Alcona County)
 Black River (Alcona County)
 Devils River
 Thunder Bay River
 Bell River
 Little Trout River
 Swan River
 Trout River
 Ocqueoc River
 Little Ocqueoc River
 Black Mallard River
 Cheboygan River, mouth at Cheboygan in Cheboygan County
 Black River (Cheboygan/Montmorency/Presque Isle/Otsego counties)
 Rainy River
 Little Rainy River
Canada Creek
 Mullett Lake
 Little Pigeon River (Cheboygan County), empties directly into Mullett Lake
 Pigeon River (Cheboygan/Otsego counties)
 Little Pigeon River (Cheboygan County)
 Indian River (Cheboygan County)
 Little Sturgeon River
 Burt Lake
 Sturgeon River (Cheboygan/Otsego counties)
 Crooked River
 Maple River (Cheboygan/Emmett counties)
 Little Carp River (Cheboygan County)
 Little Black River (Cheboygan County)

Upper Peninsula of Michigan 
 Carp River (Chippewa/Mackinac counties)
 Pine River (Chippewa/Mackinac counties)
 Potagannissing River (Drummond Island)
 Saint Mary's River
 Gogomain River
 Munuscong River
 Little Munuscong River
 Charlotte River 
 Waiska River

Lake Michigan basin

Lower Peninsula of Michigan

Northern Michigan 
 Carp Lake River
 Bear River
 Pine River (Charlevoix County)
 Lake Charlevoix
 Jordan River
 Green River
 Boyne River
Grand Traverse Bay
Elk River
 Elk Lake
 Torch River
 Rapid River (Kalkaska County, Michigan)
 Little Rapid River
 Torch Lake (Antrim County, Michigan)
 Clam Lake
 Grass River
 Lake Bellaire
 Intermediate River
 Cedar River (Antrim County, Michigan)
 Intermediate Lake
 Green River
 Sixmile Lake and other lakes
 Dingman River
 Intermediate River
 Boardman River
Boardman Lake
 Leland River, also called the Carp River
 Crystal River
 Platte River
 Betsie River
 Little Betsie River
 Manistee River
 Manistee Lake
 Little Manistee River
 Pine River (Lake/Manistee/Osceola/Wexford counties), also called South Branch of Manistee River

 Big Sable River
 Lincoln River
 Pere Marquette River
 Big South Branch Pere Marquette River
 Ruby Creek
 Baldwin River
 Pentwater River (Oceana County)

West Michigan 
 White River (Muskegon/Oceana counties)
 Muskegon River
 Maple River (Newaygo/Muskegon counties)
 Little Muskegon River
 Hersey River
 Middle Branch River
 Clam River

 Grand River
 Bass River
 Buck Creek
 Plaster Creek
 Coldbrook Creek
 Rogue River
 Thornapple River
 Coldwater River (Barry/Kent/Ionia counties)
 Little Thornapple River, in Barry County
 Little Thornapple River (Eaton County)
 Flat River
 Maple River (Ionia/Clinton/Gratiot/Shiawassee counties)
 Pine Creek, some portions called Newark and Arcadia Drain
 River Styx (Gratiot County)
 Little Maple River
 Looking Glass River
 Red Cedar River
 Sycamore Creek
 Portage River (Jackson/Washtenaw counties)
 Pigeon River (Ottawa County)
 Lake Macatawa
 Macatawa River
 Kalamazoo River
 Rabbit River
 Little Rabbit River
 Gun River
 Battle Creek River
 Black River (Allegan/Van Buren counties)
 St. Joseph River (Lake Michigan)
 Paw Paw River
 Dowagiac River
 Pigeon River (St. Joseph County)
 Fawn River
 Little Fawn River
 Prairie River
 Rocky River
 Portage River (Kalamazoo/St. Joseph counties) 
 Nottawa Creek (also known as Nottawa River)
 Coldwater River (Branch County)
 Sauk River
 Galien River
 South Branch Galien River
 Galena River

Upper Peninsula of Michigan

Green Bay 
 Menominee River
 Little River
 Little Cedar River
 Shakey River
 Sturgeon River (Dickinson County, Michigan)
 Brule River
 Paint River
 Hemlock River
 Little Hemlock River
 Net River
 Iron River (Iron County, Michigan)
 Michigamme River
 Kelso River
 Deer River
 Fence River
 Mitchigan River
 Spruce River
 Peshekee River
 Spurr River
 Cedar River (Menominee County, Michigan)
 Walton River
 Bark River
 Ford River

Little Bay de Noc
 Escanaba River
 Middle Branch Escanaba River
 Black River (Marquette County)
 Second River
 East Branch Escanaba River
 Days River
 Tacoosh River
 Rapid River (Delta/Marquette counties)
 Whitefish River

Big Bay de Noc
 Big River
 Little River
 Ogontz River
 Sturgeon River (Alger/Delta counties)
 Fishdam River
 Little Fishdam River

Remainder of Lake Michigan/Upper Peninsula 
 Manistique River
 Indian River (Alger/Schoolcraft counties)
 Little Indian River
 West Branch Manistique River
 Creighton River
 Driggs River
 Fox River
 East Branch Fox River
 Little Fox River
 Manistique Lake
 Shoepac River
 Milakokia River
 Cataract River
 Crow River
 Rock River (Lake Michigan)
 Lower Millecoquins River
 Upper Millecoquins River
 Black River (Mackinac County)
 Cut River
 Brevoort River
 Brevoort Lake
 Little Brevoort River
 Pointe aux Chenes River
 Moran River

Beaver Island 
 Jordan River

Lake Superior basin 
 Tahquamenon River
 Hendrie River
 Sage River
 Shelldrake River
 Carp River (Luce County)
 Little Two Hearted River
 Two Hearted River
 Blind Sucker River
 Dead Sucker River
 Sucker River
 Hurricane River
 Mosquito River
 Miners River
 Anna River
 Au Train River
 Rock River (Lake Superior)
 Laughing Whitefish River
 Sand River
 Chocolay River
 Carp River (Marquette County)
 Dead River
 Little Dead River
 Little Garlic River
 Big Garlic River
 Iron River (Marquette County, Michigan)
 Lake Independence
 Yellow Dog River

 Salmon Trout River (Marquette County)
 Pine River (Marquette County)
 Pine Lake
 River Styx (Marquette County)
 Mountain Stream
 Mountain Lake
 Cliff River
 Little Huron River
 Huron River (Baraga/Marquette counties)
 Huron Bay
 Ravine River
 Slate River (Baraga County)
 Silver River (Baraga County)
 Falls River
 Little Carp River (Baraga County)
 Portage River (Houghton County, Michigan), the southern end of the Keweenaw Waterway
 Snake River
 Portage Lake
 Sturgeon River (Baraga/Houghton counties)
 Otter Lake
 Otter River
 West Branch Otter River
 North Branch Otter River
 Sante River
 Little Otter River
 Silver River (Baraga County/Houghton County)
 Little Silver River
 Perch River
 Rock River (Sturgeon River tributary)
 Worm Lake
 Vermilac River
 Murphy River
 Tioga River
 Pike River
 Torch Lake
 Trap Rock River
 Pilgrim River
 Traverse River
 Tobacco River
 Big Betsy River
 Little Betsy River
 Lac La Belle
 Little Gratiot River
 Montreal River (Keweenaw County)
 Medora River
 Silver River (Keweenaw County)
 Eagle River
 Gratiot River
 Salmon Trout River (Houghton County)
 Graveraet River
 Elm River
 Little Elm River
 Misery River
 Little Misery River
 East Sleeping River
 West Sleeping River
 Firesteel River
 Flintsteel River

 Ontonagon River
 West Branch Ontonagon River
 South Branch Ontonagon River
 Lake Gogebic
 Slate River (Gogebic County)
 Pelton River or Pelton Creek
 Middle Branch Ontonagon River
 Baltimore River
 Tamarack River
 East Branch Ontonagon River
 Jumbo River
 Potato River
 Floodwood River
 Cranberry River
 Little Cranberry River
 Duck River, also called Duck Creek (Ontonogan County)
 Mineral River
 Big Iron River
 Rapid River (Ontonagon County, Michigan)
 Little Iron River
 Union River
 Little Union River
 Carp River (Gogebic/Ontonagon counties), sections also called Big Carp River and Upper Carp River
 Little Carp River (Gogebic-Ontonagon counties)
 Presque Isle River
 Little Presque Isle River
 Black River (Gogebic County)
 Little Black River (Gogebic County)
 Montreal River (Wisconsin-Michigan) (Gogebic County)

Isle Royale 
 Big Siskiwit River
 Little Siskiwit River
 Siskiwit River

See also 
List of rivers of the Americas
Lists of rivers
Elk River Chain of Lakes Watershed
Inland Waterway (Michigan)
List of rivers in the United States

References
USGS GNIS, United States Geological Survey's Geographical Names Information System

External links 

 Michigan streamflow data from the USGS
  

Michigan

Rivers